Kirin Free is a non-alcoholic beer sold in Japan by Kirin Brewery Company.

Ingredients
Malt
Dietary fiber
High-fructose corn syrup
Hops
Acidity regulator
Flavor
Amino acid of condiment
Vitamin C as an antioxidant
Bittering agent

Nutritional value per 100 g
Calories: 16 kcal
Protein: 0.1 - 0.3 g
Lipids: 0 g
Glucide (Carbohydrate): 3.3 g
Dietary fiber: 1.2 g
Sodium: 0 - 10 mg

References

External links
 Official website 
 Reuters' article "Alcohol-free brew surprise hit in beer-loving Japan" April 23, 2009 
 Wall Street Journal article "Coming to America: Kirin Beer With No Alcohol" January 24, 2011  
.

Soft drinks